Wayne Ferreira was the defending champion but lost in the first round to Younes El Aynaoui.

Yevgeny Kafelnikov won in the final 7–5, 6–3 against Arnaud Boetsch.

Seeds

  Thomas Muster (first round)
  Yevgeny Kafelnikov (champion)
  Wayne Ferreira (first round)
  Marcelo Ríos (quarterfinals)
  Thomas Enqvist (semifinals)
  Cédric Pioline (first round)
 n/a
  Michael Stich (second round)

Draw

Finals

Top half

Bottom half

References
 1996 Grand Prix de Tennis de Lyon Main Draw

1996 ATP Tour